A medicine man is a traditional healer and spiritual leader among the indigenous people of the Americas.

Medicine Man or The Medicine Man may also refer to:

Films
 The Medicine Man (1917 film), an American silent film directed by Clifford Smith
 The Medicine Man (1930 film), an American comedy film directed by Scott Pembroke
 The Medicine Man (1933 film), a British comedy film directed by Redd Davis
 Medicine Man (film), 1992 American romantic adventure

Music
"Medicine Man" (song), a 2015 song by Dr. Dre
"Medicine Man" (Gwen Stefani song), a song by Gwen Stefani from the soundtrack to the 2017 documentary film Served Like a Girl
"Medicine Man", a song by Aldo Nova from the 1991 album Blood on the Bricks
"Medicine Man", a song by Terry Cashman, Gene Pistilli, and Tommy West, aka Buchanan Brothers, from 1969
"Medicine Man", a song by Bobby McFerrin from the 1990 album Medicine Music
"Medicine Man", a song by Pantera from the 1990 album Cowboys from Hell
"Medicine Man", a song by Riot from the 1993 album Nightbreaker
"Medicine Man", an early version of the song "Rock! Rock! (Till You Drop)" by Def Leppard

Other
 "The Medicine Man" (story), a 1933 short story by Erskine Caldwell
 The Medicine Man (Dallin), an 1899 sculpture

See also
 Mickey's Medicine Man, a 1934 short film starring Mickey Rooney
 The Medicine Men, an American music production team
 The Medicine Men (film), a 1938 American short
 "The Medicine Men" (The Avengers), a 1963 episode of the British television show
 Folk healer,